The Baleares class are a group of five frigates built for the Spanish navy in the 1970s. The ships are a modified version of the American s. The key differences are the replacement of the Sea Sparrow PDMS and ASW helicopter facilities by Standard SAM and associated radars. They received a SPS-52B 3D search radar and one SPG-51 illuminator for the Standard SM-1 medium range SAM, fired from a Mk22 16-round single arm launcher. The SQS-26 long range LF sonar was replaced by a SQS-23G MF sonar, while two Mk25 tubes for Mk37 torpedoes were mounted in the transom. The SQS-35 variable depth sonar was maintained.

The five ships were upgraded several times during their service lives. They received a Spanish TRITAN combat data system and the EW suite was upgraded with Spanish equipment. Mk36 SROC decoy launchers were also added, as well as two quadruple Harpoon launchers amidships. Two Meroka CIWS gun system were also fitted. The old SQS-23G sonar was replaced by a modern DE-1160LF set built in Spain (a larger, lower frequency version of the SQS-56 sonar) and the Mk25 tubes were removed to allow for female crewmember berthing.

The ships have recently been retired, in order to assume the costs of the F100 frigates (the Álvaro de Bazán-class frigate), which will replace the Baleares class on a one-to-one basis.

Ships in class

All ships were built in Ferrol. They made up the 31 Escort Squadron, based in Ferrol. The Spanish Navy adopted the Standard SAM, providing the class an anti-air (A/A) capability, which the American Knox class lacked.

References

Conway's All the World's Fighting Ships 1947 -1995

 
Frigates of the Spanish Navy
Frigate classes
Ships built in Spain